Tender Loving Rage is a novel by science fiction author Alfred Bester, published posthumously in 1991, four years after Bester's death in 1987.  In his 1991 article, "Alfred Bester's Tender Loving Rage" (reprinted in Platt's Loose Canon [2001]), his friend Charles Platt explains that Bester wrote the novel around 1959 using the title Tender Loving Rape.  The book went unsold for many years, until Platt (who had read the manuscript much earlier while working at Avon in 1972) persuaded Bester to allow him to get the book published by a small press; Platt suggested the change of title and Bester agreed.

Critical response 

Arthur D. Hlavaty, a former editor of The New York Review of Science Fiction, described it as "a mimetic novel called Tender Loving Rape, which was posthumously published with its title minimally but cleverly emended to the less offensive Tender Loving Rage. It is a hologram of his career: brilliant start to sodden, cranky, incoherent conclusion."

Platt wrote, "No one should assume, from the novel's history, that it was a minor work. Like all of Bester's books, it was ambitious: by turns a picaresque journey, a suspense novel, and a love story (this last being something he had never attempted before). It was also a roman-a-clef."

References

External links
  

1991 American novels
American thriller novels
Novels by Alfred Bester
Novels published posthumously
Novels set in New York (state)